New Bridge crosses the River Usk at Newbridge-on-Usk between Usk and Caerleon. The bridge carries the B4236. It was constructed in 1779, probably by William Edwards, a prominent civil engineer of Pontypridd, or by a member of his bridge-building dynasty. The bridge has Grade II* listed building status.

History
An earlier crossing of the Usk at Newbridge was the medieval Tredynog Bridge, constructed in timber. Following its collapse, the present replacement was constructed in 1779. It was built by Walter Bowen and Christopher Thorn and its design is attributed to either William Edwards, or "a member of the celebrated Edwards family of bridge-builders".

Architecture and description
The bridge is constructed of Old Red Sandstone ashlar. It has three arches, with two piers in water. The piers form pedestrian refuges on the bridge. The architectural historian John Newman describes the bridge as "an extremely fine design beautifully executed". The bridge is a Grade II* listed structure.

Notes

References
 

Grade II* listed bridges in Wales
Bridges in Monmouthshire
Grade II* listed buildings in Monmouthshire
Stone bridges in the United Kingdom
Bridges over the River Usk
Bridges completed in 1779